Nazi Safavi (born 1967, in Tehran, Iran), is an Iranian writer. Her novels mostly concern women battling tradition and modernity in Iranian society. She is popularly known for her novel Hallway to Paradise which is a best-seller in Iran.

Publications/Books
 Hallway to Paradise (دالان بهشت), was published in 1999.  In 2011, on the occasion of the 40th printing, fellow writer Yousef Alikhani praised the book as one of the best novels he had ever read. Hallway to Paradise has sold more than 250,000 copies and been reprinted 47 times. 
 Purgatory, Yet Heaven (برزخ اما بهشت), was published in 2005.
 Barzakh Amma Behesht Nazi Safavi 
  (in Persian), co-authored with نازی صفوی 
 Cennet Koridoru (Turkish Edition)
 In 2020 she published Isthmus but Paradise.

References

External links/References
 Books From Iran: Corridor of Paradise book
 Nazi Safavi's List of published books
 Dalan behesht

Iranian writers
Iranian women writers
1967 births
Living people